Criminology is a United States-based, true crime podcast hosted by Mike Ferguson and Mike Morford. Each season of the podcast focuses on a single, unsolved crime or criminal spree; it has previously covered the Zodiac Killer and the Golden State Killer. According to Laura Findlay, writing at Lifehacker, it is known for its "meticulous research".

See also
 Generation Why (podcast)

References

Crime podcasts
Audio podcasts
2017 podcast debuts
Patreon creators
American podcasts